The 1999 Madrilenian regional election was held on Sunday, 13 June 1999, to elect the 5th Assembly of the Community of Madrid. All 102 seats in the Assembly were up for election. The election was held simultaneously with regional elections in twelve other autonomous communities and local elections all throughout Spain, as well as the 1999 European Parliament election.

While the People's Party (PP) of Alberto Ruiz-Gallardón was widely expected to win a second term and expand its absolute majority in the Assembly of Madrid—with opinion polls predicting a comfortable victory with as many as 59 seats—its gains ended up being minimal. The extremely low turnout, one of the lowest in a regional election, benefitted the opposition Spanish Socialist Workers' Party (PSOE) instead, which saw a strong performance as a result at the expense of the United Left (IU), which lost half of its votes and seats.

Overview

Electoral system
The Assembly of Madrid was the devolved, unicameral legislature of the autonomous community of Madrid, having legislative power in regional matters as defined by the Spanish Constitution and the Madrilenian Statute of Autonomy, as well as the ability to vote confidence in or withdraw it from a regional president.

Voting for the Assembly was on the basis of universal suffrage, which comprised all nationals over 18 years of age, registered in the Community of Madrid and in full enjoyment of their political rights. All members of the Assembly of Madrid were elected using the D'Hondt method and a closed list proportional representation, with an electoral threshold of five percent of valid votes—which included blank ballots—being applied regionally. The Assembly was entitled to one member per each 50,000 inhabitants or fraction greater than 25,000.

Election date
The term of the Assembly of Madrid expired four years after the date of its previous election. Elections to the Assembly were fixed for the fourth Sunday of May every four years. Legal amendments introduced in 1998 allowed for these to be held together with European Parliament elections, provided that they were scheduled for within a four month-timespan. The previous election was held on 28 May 1995, setting the election date for the Regional Assembly concurrently with a European Parliament election on Sunday, 13 June 1999.

The president had the prerogative to dissolve the Assembly of Madrid and call a snap election, provided that no motion of no confidence was in process, no nationwide election was due and some time requirements were met: namely, that dissolution did not occur either during the first legislative session or within the legislature's last year ahead of its scheduled expiry, nor before one year had elapsed since a previous dissolution. In the event of an investiture process failing to elect a regional president within a two-month period from the first ballot, the Assembly was to be automatically dissolved and a fresh election called. Any snap election held as a result of these circumstances would not alter the period to the next ordinary election, with elected deputies merely serving out what remained of their four-year terms.

Parties and candidates
The electoral law allowed for parties and federations registered in the interior ministry, coalitions and groupings of electors to present lists of candidates. Parties and federations intending to form a coalition ahead of an election were required to inform the relevant Electoral Commission within ten days of the election call, whereas groupings of electors needed to secure the signature of at least 0.5 percent of the electorate in the Community of Madrid, disallowing electors from signing for more than one list of candidates.

Below is a list of the main parties and electoral alliances which contested the election:

Opinion polls
The table below lists voting intention estimates in reverse chronological order, showing the most recent first and using the dates when the survey fieldwork was done, as opposed to the date of publication. Where the fieldwork dates are unknown, the date of publication is given instead. The highest percentage figure in each polling survey is displayed with its background shaded in the leading party's colour. If a tie ensues, this is applied to the figures with the highest percentages. The "Lead" column on the right shows the percentage-point difference between the parties with the highest percentages in a poll. When available, seat projections determined by the polling organisations are displayed below (or in place of) the percentages in a smaller font; 52 seats were required for an absolute majority in the Assembly of Madrid.

Results

Overall

Elected legislators
The following table lists the elected legislators sorted by order of election.

Aftermath
Investiture processes to elect the President of the Community of Madrid required for an absolute majority—more than half the votes cast—to be obtained in the first ballot. If unsuccessful, a new ballot would be held 48 hours later requiring only of a simple majority—more affirmative than negative votes—to succeed. If such majorities were not achieved, successive candidate proposals would be processed under the same procedure. In the event of the investiture process failing to elect a regional President within a two-month period from the first ballot, the Assembly would be automatically dissolved and a snap election called.

Notes

References
Opinion poll sources

Other

1999 in the Community of Madrid
Madrid
Regional elections in the Community of Madrid
June 1999 events in Europe